Tane Tu'ipulotu (born 7 February 1982) is a former rugby union player for the Hurricanes in the Super Rugby competition. He played as a centre. He was loaned to the Manawatu Turbos for the 2006 season. He has represented the Pacific Islanders. In summer of 2008 he signed for the Guinness Premiership side Newcastle Falcons, to arrive in November 2008, after the Air New Zealand cup. Tu'ipulotu quickly became a fan favourite at the club before joining the Yamaha Júbilo in 2012. In 2013 he retired from rugby due to a knee injury.

References

1981 births
Living people
Tongan rugby union players
Rugby union centres
Tongan expatriate rugby union players
Tongan emigrants to New Zealand
Expatriate rugby union players in England
Expatriate rugby union players in Japan
Tongan expatriate sportspeople in Japan
Tongan expatriate sportspeople in England
Chiefs (rugby union) players
Newcastle Falcons players
Shizuoka Blue Revs players
Auckland rugby union players
Wellington rugby union players
Manawatu rugby union players
Hurricanes (rugby union) players
People educated at Saint Kentigern College